Demeu Zhadrayev (born 2 November 1989) is a Kazakhstani Greco-Roman wrestler. He won the silver medal in the 71 kg event at the 2017 World Wrestling Championships held in Paris, France.

In 2018, he won the silver medal in the men's 72 kg event at the Asian Wrestling Championships in Bishkek, Kyrgyzstan. He also won a bronze medal, in different weight classes, at this event in 2015, 2019 and 2021.

He competed in the men's 77 kg event at the 2020 Summer Olympics held in Tokyo, Japan.

References

External links 

 

Living people
1989 births
Kazakhstani male sport wrestlers
World Wrestling Championships medalists
Asian Wrestling Championships medalists
Wrestlers at the 2020 Summer Olympics
Olympic wrestlers of Kazakhstan
21st-century Kazakhstani people